Kleppur or Kleppsspítali is an Icelandic psychiatric hospital that is operated by The National University Hospital of Iceland.

The first laws concerning Kleppur were nr. 33/1905, accepted by Christian IX on 20 October and the institution was opened in 1907, originally housing 50 patients. Kleppur was the first medical institution that was constructed and ran completely on public funds. The institution's administration consisted of the Icelandic Director of Health and individuals appointed by the Icelandic government.

At the time of the hospital's founding, mental illness was a very big issue. Mentally ill individuals were commonly mistreated and their quality of living were nowhere near that of those who were of good mental health. The year 1901, a census was done to count the number of mentally ill individuals in the country. The census found 133 mentally ill individuals, 124 of which lived in rural areas.

The hospital changed a lot, although it could not take in everyone that needed is, as the Director of Health at that time told Alþingi.

The hospital's methods of operation have changed drastically of the years with the introduction of new and improved therapeutics. Today, Kleppur's operations mainly consist of rehabilitation and various treatments for people with mental health problems, such as schizophrenia, bipolar disorder, anxiety, depression and addiction. Kleppur now has a polyclinic, one psychiatric rehabilitation wards, a security ward, and a forensic unit. A rehabilitation center adjacent to the hospital is in use for patents and outpatients.

Gallery 
The pictures are of the hospital's building, taken in March 2006.

Sources 
 
 
 
 
 
 
 
 Stjórnartíðindi A, 1905-1907, bls. 212.
 Alþingistíðindi B, 1905, bls. 1125-1144.
 Alþingistíðindi B, 1907, bls. 2683.

Psychiatric hospitals in Iceland